Damir Džombić (born 3 January 1985 in Srebrenik, SFR Yugoslavia) is a Bosnian retired football player who played as defender.

Club career
Džombić played his early youth football by Wangen bei Olten. In 2002 he joined the youth department of FC Basel and played in their U-21 team, in the third tier of Swiss football. During the spring in 2004 he was called up to their first team by head coach Christian Gross. Džombić played his domestic league debut for the club in the away game in the Stadion Brügglifeld on 18 April as Basel were defeated 3–0 by Aarau. He played the full 90 minutes, but was booked for a rude foul. At the end of the 2003–04 league season Basel won the championship.

To the beginning of the next 2004–05 season, Džombić only had appearances in test games. So at the end of July he was loaned out to Swiss Challenge League team FC Wil so that he could gain playing experience. Wil had been relegated the season before but had also won the Swiss Cup and were qualified for the UEFA Cup. Here in the first round, they played against Slovakian club Dukla Banská Bystrica. In the first leg an away game on 12 August 2004 in the SNP Stadium, Džombić was dismissed in the 78th minute for a second bookable foul.

Then he returned to Basel, but he failed to break into their first-team. In February 2006 he suffered a cruciate ligament tear, which threw him back in his progression. To help in his rehabilitation, the next season he trained and played with the U-21 team. The club understood his situation and he was released in 2007. 

On 20 June 2007 it was announced that Džombić had signed a one-year contract for Liechtenstein's second tier team FC Vaduz on a free transfer. He played with them regularly in the 2007–08 Challenge League season and helped them win the division one point ahead of AC Bellinzona to earn promotion to the Swiss Super League in 2008. The team also won the 2007–08 Liechtenstein Cup. The club and the centre back prolonged their contract for a further season. Džombić scored the first goal in his professional career against FC Sion at the Rheinpark Stadion on 16 August 2008. But this could not help the team, because they suffered a 2–1 defeat. The team won the 2008–09 Liechtenstein Cup. However, at the end of the 2008–09 season Vaduz were in bottom positions in the league table and suffered relegation.

In the 2009–10 season Džombić was without a club and in August 2010 he signed for FC Aarau. However it soon came to internal differences and in December he was released by the club. In January 2011 he joined FC Wil for training purposes only. As he was free agent he was able to sign for Schaffhausen outside the transfer window and on 10 May it was announced that they had received the license to do so, until the end of the season.

He later played for several lower league sides in Switzerland.

International career
Džombić was capped for Swiss youth teams before he switched allegiance to Bosnia and Herzegovina. He played for their U21 team in 2006 UEFA European Under-21 Football Championship qualification.

Honours
Basel
 Swiss Super League: 2003–04

Vaduz
 Swiss Challenge League: 2007–08
 Liechtenstein Football Cup: 2007–08, 2008–09

References

Sources
 Die ersten 125 Jahre. Publisher: Josef Zindel im Friedrich Reinhardt Verlag, Basel. 
 Verein "Basler Fussballarchiv" Homepage

External links
 Profile at Swiss Football League Website 
 FC Vaduz profile 

1985 births
Living people
People from Srebrenik
Bosnia and Herzegovina emigrants to Switzerland
Association football defenders
Swiss men's footballers
Switzerland youth international footballers
Bosnia and Herzegovina footballers
Bosnia and Herzegovina under-21 international footballers
FC Basel players
FC Wil players
FC Vaduz players
FC Aarau players
FC Schaffhausen players
SC Kriens players
FC Grenchen players
FC Wangen bei Olten players
Swiss Super League players
Swiss Challenge League players
Swiss Promotion League players
Swiss 1. Liga (football) players
Bosnia and Herzegovina expatriate footballers
Swiss expatriate footballers
Swiss expatriate sportspeople in Liechtenstein
Expatriate footballers in Liechtenstein
Bosnia and Herzegovina expatriate sportspeople in Liechtenstein